Bryn Howells (9 February 1911 – 6 June 1983) was a Welsh rugby union, and professional rugby league footballer who played in the 1930s and 1940s. He played representative level rugby union (RU) for Wales, and at club level for Llanelli RFC, as a Fullback, i.e. number 15, and club level rugby league (RL) for Broughton Rangers.

Background
Bryn Howells was born in Hendy, Wales, he was also a professional cricketer in the Lancashire League, he shared a house in Fallowfield with Frank Whitcombe when the two signed for rugby league club Broughton Rangers, and he died in aged 72 in Llangyfelach, Wales.

International honours
Bryn Howells won a cap for Wales (RU) while at Llanelli RFC in 1934 against England.

Notable tour matches
Bryn Howells played Fullback, i.e. number 15, in Llanelli RFC’s 0-9 defeat by South Africa in the tour match at Stradey Park on 24 November 1931.

References

External links
Search for "Howells" at rugbyleagueproject.org

Statistics at scrum.com
Statistics at wru.co.uk

1911 births
1983 deaths
Footballers who switched code
Llanelli RFC players
Broughton Rangers players
Rugby league players from Carmarthenshire
Rugby union fullbacks
Rugby union players from Hendy
Wales international rugby union players
Welsh rugby league players
Welsh rugby union players